Rafael Pascual Cortés (born March 16, 1970, in Madrid) is a former Spanish volleyball player who is nicknamed "El Toro", "El Macho" and/or "El León". He is the best Spanish volleyball player of all time. A two-time Olympian (1992 and 2000), he was named the most valuable player of the 1998 FIVB Men's World Championship in Japan.

Sporting achievements

National team
 1995  Universiade

Individual awards
 MVP 1998 FIVB Volleyball Men's World Championship
 1999 FIVB World Cup "Best Scorer"

References

  Profile

1970 births
Living people
Spanish men's volleyball players
Volleyball players at the 1992 Summer Olympics
Volleyball players at the 2000 Summer Olympics
Olympic volleyball players of Spain
Sportspeople from Madrid
Universiade medalists in volleyball
Universiade silver medalists for Spain
Medalists at the 1995 Summer Universiade